Black coat, blackcoat or variant may refer to:

 Any kind of coat that is black
 Black (horse), horses that are black coated 
 Chernodreshkovci, the traditional dress of the Shopi
 The Black Coat, 2013 novel by Neamat Imam
 The Black Coats aka Les Habits Noirs, 19th century crime fiction novel series by Paul Féval
 Black Coat Press, publishing firm translating and publishing French pulpers into English
 A clergyman

See also
 Black Coats & Bandages, 2004 album by Clann Zu 
 Black Coats & Bandages, 2004 song from the eponymous album by Clann Zu, see Black Coats & Bandages
 Black robe (disambiguation)
 Black (disambiguation)
 Coat (disambiguation)